Manhood is the debut solo album by rapper stic.man (from the hip-hop duo dead prez). The album was released October 23, 2007.

Track listing

Note
Tracks 17-68 = Silent interludes, "Faithful Lover" is actually track 69 on the CD.

References

2007 debut albums
Stic.man albums